The Gasuden Jimpu or Kamikaze (later produced by Hitachi) was a Japanese seven-cylinder air-cooled radial aircraft engine from the 1920s, 1930s and 1940s. It was produced in large numbers to power training and light aircraft before and during the Pacific War.

Design and development
The early development of aircraft in Japan was fully dependent on engines from abroad, although many of these designs were license built by Japanese companies. Gasuden was no exception, building Le Rhone rotaries in the early 1920s. However, by 1926, the company had gained enough experience to develop its own first engine. Taking inspiration from the Armstrong Siddeley Mongoose, the company developed a seven-cylinder star-shaped radial made of alloy and using an integral impellor-based carburettor. The prototype was first run in 1927 and was the first indigenous design to achieve production in Japan.

The resulting engine was a single row radial with seven cylinders of bore  and stroke . The engine had no compressor, although some later models were fitted with a single speed mechanical supercharger to boost performance.

Production ran from 1928 to 1944. Large numbers were delivered, primarily for training and other light aircraft. Amongst the more numerous were the Yokosuka K2Y2 Type 3, a derivative of the Avro 504N which was produced from 1929 to 1940, and the Yokosuka K4Y1 seaplane produced between 1933 and 1940, mainly by Watanabe. In May 1939, Hitachi acquired Tokyo Gas and Electric Company, merging the aeronautical part of the business with Hitachi Aircraft. The engine was rebranded Hitachi. Production totalled between 8,300 and 12,500 units.

Variants
Jimpu 2 
Jimpu 3 
Jimpu 6 
Jimpu Kai

The Tempu became an important engine for the company, taking 53% of production in July 1944.

Applications
 Aichi AB-3 130 hp
 Aiba Tsubami IV 130 hp
 Gasuden KR-1 150 hp
 Gasuden KR-2 150 hp
 Hitachi T.2 150 hp
 Kawanishi K8K1 160 hp
 Tachikawa KKY-2 150 hp
 Tachikawa R-38 150 hp
 Watanabe K8W1 160 hp
 Yokosuka E6Y 160 hp
 Yokosuka K2Y2 130 hp 
 Yokosuka K4Y1 130 hp

Specifications

See also

References

Citations

Bibliography

 
 
 
 
 
 
 
 

1920s aircraft piston engines
Aircraft air-cooled radial piston engines
Hitachi